Apollophanes Soter (epithet means "the Saviour"; reigned c. 35 – 25 BCE) was an Indo-Greek king in the area of eastern and central Punjab in modern India and Pakistan.

Rule
Little is known about him, except for some of his remaining coins. The dating is Osmund Bopearachchi's, but R. C. Senior suggests approximately the same dates. Earlier scholars, such as Professor Ahmed Hasan Dani, W.W. Tarn and A.K. Narain dated Apollophanes considerably earlier, but the style and finding places of his coins make it clear that he belonged to the last line of eastern Indo-Greek kings, not long before they were overcome completely by pressure from the Indo-Scythians.

He may have been a relative of Apollodotus II Soter since both kings share the epithet Soter (Saviour), have names related to Apollo and use Pallas Athene as their reverse.

Coins of Apollophanes

Apollophanes issued a few debased silver drachms of the type seen above, struck with a single monogram and of little artistic quality. He seems to have been an insignificant local ruler. Apollophanes wears what appears to be a Macedonian helmet of the type seen on the Alexander Mosaic which he was the last Indo-Greek ruler to use.

Apollophanes used exclusively a single "boxy" mint-mark, in keeping with late Indo-Greek kings.

See also
 Greco-Bactrian Kingdom
 Seleucid Empire
 Greco-Buddhism
 Indo-Scythians
 Indo-Parthian Kingdom
 Kushan Empire

References

References
 The Greeks in Bactria and India, W.W. Tarn, Cambridge University Press.
 The Bactrian and Indus Greeks, Ahmed Hasan Dani, Lahore Museum
 The Indo-Greeks - Revisited and Supplemented, A.K. Narain, BR Publishing Corporation
 Monnaies Gréco-Bactriennes et Indo-Grecques, Osmund Bopearachchi, Bibliothèque Nationale de France.

Indo-Greek kings
1st-century BC rulers in Asia